The Apulian regional election of 1990 took place on 6 and 7 May 1990.

Events
Christian Democracy was by far the largest party, largely ahead of its major competitors, the Italian Communist Party, which had its worst result ever in a regional election, and the Italian Socialist Party, that gained its best result ever and even surpassed the Communists.

After the election Christian Democrat Michele Bellomo was elected President of the Region at the head of a centre-left coalition (Organic Centre-left). After the Tangentopoli scandals, Bellomo was replaced by a succession of short-lived governments.

Results

Source: Ministry of the Interior

Elections in Apulia
1990 elections in Italy